The 2022 Asian Games will feature 51 competition venues on the sixteen days Games competition from 10 to 25 September 2022.

Sporting venues

Hangzhou Sports Center

Binjiang District

Chun'an County

Fuyang District

Gongshu District

Lin'an District

Linping District

Qiantang District

Shangcheng District

Tonglu County

Xiaoshan District

Xihu District

Yuhang District

Outside Hangzhou

References

 
2022 Asian Games
2022